Los dineros del diablo (The Devil's Money) is a Mexican drama film directed by Alejandro Galindo. It was released in 1953 and starring Amalia Aguilar and Roberto Cañedo.

Plot
Manuel (Roberto Cañedo), a worker in a textile factory, meets accidentally Estrella (Amalia Aguilar), a rumba dancer. Manuel suffers for money and Estrella offers her help. After the death of his father and the need for money for his funeral, Manuel seeks Estrella, that puts him in touch with El Gitano (Victor Parra), a gangster who invites Manuel to join his band. With his help, El Gitano steal the factory where Manuel worked. The police stopped the boss of Manuel (father of the girl that he likes), but then they discover that Manuel is guilty. He flees and takes refuge with El Gitano and his band. In a showdown, Manuel tries to kill El Gitano. When the police arrive to arrest Manuel repents and on crutches, he was transferred in train to a prison.

Cast
 Amalia Aguilar ... Estrella
 Roberto Cañedo ... Manuel Olea
 Víctor Parra ... El Gitano
 Arturo Soto Rangel ... Don Teodoro
 Prudencia Grifell ... Mrs. Olea

Reviews
After the success of the film A Family Like Many Others (1948), the filmmaker Alejandro Galindo and the actor David Silva had, separately, a tight work agenda. This somehow prevented that David starred Los dineros del diablo, a slum thriller that was finished starred by Roberto Cañedo and Victor Parra in the role of the villain.

References

External links
 
 HoyCinema: Los dineros del diablo
 The Other 100 Best Mexican Movies

1953 films
Mexican black-and-white films
Rumberas films
1950s Spanish-language films
Mexican drama films
1953 drama films
1950s Mexican films